Torodora sciadosa is a moth in the family Lecithoceridae. It is found in Taiwan and Sichuan, China.

The wingspan is 18 mm.

References

Moths described in 1994
Torodora